B. Traven: A Vision of Mexico is a study of B. Traven's experience in Mexico written by Heidi Zogbaum.

Bibliography

External links 

 

1992 non-fiction books
English-language books
Biographies about anarchists
Biographies about writers
Books about Mexico